Thomas Boberg (born 5 May 1960 in Roskilde) is a Danish poet and travel writer. Since his debut in 1984 he has received extensive recognition for his contribution to Danish literature. Since 2018 member of The Danish Academy (Det Danske Akademi).

Boberg lived in Peru for several years and has traveled widely in Latin America and Africa. Many of his works stem from his travels in South and Central America, often focusing on the exploited and poor. Boberg has been nominated twice for the Nordic Council's Literature Prize, in 1999 for Americas, and in 2006 for Livsstil (Life Style).

Thomas Boberg is the son of the surrealist painter Jørgen Boberg (1940–2009).

Bibliography
Hvæsende ved mit øjekast (1984) - poems
Ud af mit liv (1985) - poems
Hvid Glød (1986) - poems
Slaggerdyret (1987) - poems
Vor tids historie (1989) - poems
Marionetdrømme (1991) - poems
Vandbærere (1993) - poems
Pelikanens Flugt (1994) - poems
Sølvtråden (1996) - travel memoirs
Under Hundestjernen (1997) - poems
Marokkansk Motiv (1998) - with Simon Lautrop
Americas (1999) - travel memoirs
En stående aftale (2002) - poems
Invitation til at rejse (2003) - travel memoirs
Livsstil (2005) - poems
Under Uret (2006) - short stories
Gæstebogen (2007) - poems
Flakker (2008) - novel
 Boothill (2009) - digte
 Hesteæderne (2010) – digte
 Hesteæderne II (2011) – digte
 I den næste by (2012) - rejseminder
 Fantombillede(2014) -digte
 Svanesang (2015) - digte
 Hesteæderne/Trilogien (2015) - digte
 Mexicocitydigte (2017) - digte

References

Danish male poets
1960 births
Living people
Recipients of the Grand Prize of the Danish Academy
20th-century Danish poets
21st-century Danish poets
20th-century Danish male writers
21st-century Danish male writers
People from Roskilde